ICSD may refer to:

 Interfaith Center for Sustainable Development
Inorganic Crystal Structure Database
 International Central Securities Depository
 International Classification of Sleep Disorders
 Ithaca City School District
 International Committee of Sports for the Deaf